Óscar de Jesús Vargas Restrepo (born 23 March 1964) is a Colombian former road racing cyclist, who was a professional rider from 1985 to 1995.

During the 1992 Vuelta a España, Vargas won stage 20, ahead of eventual overall winner Tony Rominger. However, he failed the subsequent doping test, returning a positive for caffeine, and was stripped of his result, with the stage win awarded to Rominger. He was given a three-month suspension.

Major results

1985
 5th Overall Clásico RCN
 8th Overall Vuelta a Colombia
1986
 1st Subida a Urkiola
 3rd Clasica de Sabiñanigo
1987
 5th Overall Vuelta a España
 8th Overall Vuelta a Colombia
1989
 1st Stage 7 Vuelta a Colombia
 3rd Overall Vuelta a España 
1st  Mountains classification
1st  Combination classification
1990
 2nd Road race, National Road Championships
 7th Overall Volta a Catalunya
1991
 2nd Overall Vuelta a Colombia
 4th Overall Clásico RCN
1992
 1st Stage 20 Vuelta a España
 9th Overall Paris–Nice
1993
 3rd Overall Clásico RCN
1994
 5th Overall Clásico RCN
 6th Overall Vuelta a Colombia 
1995
 1st  Overall Vuelta a Antioquia
 3rd Road race, National Road Championships 
 8th Overall  Clásico RCN

Grand Tour general classification results timeline

References

 

1964 births
Living people
Colombian male cyclists
Sportspeople from Antioquia Department